Mangana is a settlement in the municipality Topeiros in the Xanthi regional unit of Greece. In 2011, the population was 635.

References

Populated places in Xanthi (regional unit)